Following is the list of cultural heritage sites in Karachi, Sindh, Pakistan.

Protected sites
Following is the list of sites formerly protected by the Government of Pakistan.

|}

Protected Heritage
The sites below are declared Protected Heritage by the Government of Sindh.

Karachi has over 350 sites which are protected under the Provincial Act. Sites are listed under broad areas or quarters under which they are located. Some streets/roads are found in two areas. Sites located on them are found under their respective area.

Bunder Quarter
This includes Muhammad Ali Jinnah Road (formerly Bunder Road) which is one of the city’s main arteries. It also includes some places near the main road. 

|}

Cantonment

|}

Civil Lines

|}

Clifton

|}

Dr. Ziauddin Ahmed Road

|}

Frere Town Quarter

|}

Keamari

|}

Manora

|}

Market and Jail Quarters

|}

Queen’s Road Quarter

|}

Saddar
Buildings in this section are arranged according to the street on which they are located. This also includes smaller streets off main streets.

|}

Serai Road

|}

Miscellaneous

|}

Unprotected Heritage

|}

See also
 List of cultural heritage sites in Sindh

References

Monuments and memorials in Karachi
Culture of Karachi
Karachi-related lists